The  is a group of kofun burial mounds located in Ninomiya neighborhood of the city of Tsuyama, Okayama Prefecture, in the San'yō region of Japan. The tumuli were collectively designated a National Historic Site in 2015.

Background
The Miyayama Kofun cluster is located on a hill along the left bank of the Yoshii River to the west of the Tsuyama urban area. The site was initially scheduled to be razed for a housing estate in 1977, but after the discovery of the kofun cluster, a 30,000 square meter area was quickly placed under protection as a National Historic Site for preservation. Within this area are four surviving tumuli. It has a length of 80 meters, making it one of the largest keyhole-shaped burial mounds in the Mimasaka region. The three others are all circular-type. Fukiishi remain on some areas of the tumuli. Artifacts excavated include haniwa fragments with patterns drawn by a spatula. From these artifacts, the tumuli are believed to have been built in the 4th century. The tumuli themselves have not been excavated, so details of the burial chambers are unknown.

Miwayama Castle was built on this site during the Sengoku period (14th to 16th centuries), and the east and west overhangs of Miwayama No. 1 are believed to be the remains of Miwayama Castle's earthen walls.

The site is maintained as a park, and is located 15 minutes on foot from Innoshō Station on the JR West Kishin Line.

Gallery

See also
List of Historic Sites of Japan (Okayama)

References

External links

Tsuyama Tourist Information home page 
Okayama Prefecture home page 

Kofun
Archaeological sites in Japan
History of Okayama Prefecture
Tsuyama
Historic Sites of Japan